A cyclorotor, cycloidal rotor, cycloidal propeller or cyclogiro, is a fluid propulsion device that converts shaft power into the acceleration of a fluid using a rotating axis perpendicular to the direction of fluid motion. It uses several blades with a spanwise axis parallel to the axis of rotation and perpendicular to the direction of fluid motion. These blades are cyclically pitched twice per revolution to produce force (thrust or lift) in any direction normal to the axis of rotation. Cyclorotors are used for propulsion, lift, and control on air and water vehicles. An aircraft using cyclorotors as the primary source of lift, propulsion, and control is known as a cyclogyro or cyclocopter. A unique aspect is that it can change the magnitude and direction of thrust without the need of tilting any aircraft structures. The patented application, used on ships with particular actuation mechanisms both mechanical or hydraulic, is named after German company Voith Turbo.

Operating principle
 
Cyclorotors produce thrust by combined action of a rotation of a fixed point of the blades around a centre and the oscillation of the blades that changes their angle-of-attack over time. The joint action of the advancement produced by the orbital motion and pitch angle variation generates a higher thrust at low speed than any other propeller. In hover, the blades are actuated to a positive pitch (outward from the centre of the rotor) on the upper half of their revolution and a negative pitch (inward towards the axis of rotation) over the lower half inducing a net upward aerodynamic force and opposite fluid downwash. By varying the phase of this pitch motion the force can be shifted to any perpendicular angle or even downward. Before blade stall, increasing the amplitude of the pitching kinematics will magnify thrust.

History

The origin of the rotocycloid propeller are Russian and relates to the aeronautic domain. Sverchkov's "Samoljot" (St. Petersburg, 1909) or "wheel orthopter" was the first vehicle expressly thought to have used this type of propulsion. Its scheme came near to cyclogiro, but it's difficult to classify it precisely. It had three flat surfaces and a rudder; the rear edge of one of surfaces could be bent, replacing the action of an elevator. Lift and thrust had to be created by paddle wheels consisting of 12 blades, established in pairs under a 120° angle. The blades of a concave shape were changing an angle of incidence by the means of eccentrics and springs. In a bottom of the craft 10 hp engine was arranged. Transmission was ensured by a belt. Empty weight was about 200 kg. "Samoljot" was constructed by the military engineer E.P. Sverchkov with the grants of the Main Engineering Agency in St. Petersburg in 1909, was demonstrated at the Newest Inventions Exhibition and won a medal. Otherwise, it could not pass the preliminary tests without flying.

In 1914, Russian inventor and scientist A.N. Lodygin addressed the Russian government with the project of the cyclogiro-like aircraft, his scheme was similar to Sverchkov's "Samoljot". The project was not carried out.

In 1933, experiments in Germany by Adolf Rohrbach resulted in a paddle-wheel wing arrangement. Oscillating winglets went from positive to negative angles of attack during each revolution to create lift, and their eccentric mounting would, in theory, produce nearly any combination of horizontal and vertical forces. The DVL evaluated Rohrbach's design, but the foreign aviation journals of the time cast doubt on the soundness of the design which meant that funding for the project could not be raised, even with a latter proposal as a Luftwaffe transport aircraft. There appears to be no evidence that this design was ever built, let alone flown. Based on Rohrbach's paddle-wheel research, however, Platt in the US designed by 1933 his own independent Cyclogyro. His paddle-wheel wing arrangement was awarded a US patent (which was only one of many similar patents on file), and underwent extensive wind-tunnel testing at MIT in 1927. Despite this, there is no evidence Platt's aircraft was ever built.

The first operative cycloid propulsion was developed at Voith. Its origins date to the decision of the Voith company to focus on the business of transmission gear assemblies for turbines. The famous Voight propeller was based on its fluid-dynamics know-how gained from previous turbine projects. It was invented by Ernst Schneider, and enhanced by Voith. It was launched with name of Voith-Schneider Propeller (VSP) for commercial vessels. This new marine drive could significantly improve the manoeuvrability of a ship as demonstrated in the successful sea trials on the test boat Torqueo, in 1937. The first Voith Schneider Propellers were put into operation in the narrow canals of Venice, Italy. During the 1937 World Fair in Paris, Voith was awarded the grand prize – three times – for its exhibition of Voith Schneider Propellers and Voith turbo-transmissions. A year later, two of Paris' fire-fighting boats started operating with the new VSP system.

Design advantages and challenges

Rapid thrust vectoring
Cyclorotors provide a high degree of control. Traditional propellers, rotors, and jet engines produce thrust only along their axis of rotation and require rotation of the entire device to alter the thrust direction. This rotation requires large forces and comparatively long time scales since the propeller inertia is considerable, and the rotor gyroscopic forces resist rotation. For many practical applications (helicopters, airplanes, ships) this requires rotating the entire vessel. In contrast, cyclorotors need only to vary the blade pitch motions. Since there is little inertia associated with blade pitch change, thrust vectoring in the plane perpendicular to the axis of rotation is rapid.

High advance ratio thrust and symmetric lift
Cyclorotors can produce lift and thrust at high advance ratios, which, in theory, would enable a cyclogyro aircraft to fly at subsonic speeds well exceeding those of single rotor helicopters. Single rotor helicopters are limited in forward speed by a combination of retreating blade stall and sonic blade tip constraints. As helicopters fly forward, the tip of the advancing blade experiences a wind velocity that is the sum of the helicopter forward speed and rotor rotational speed. This value cannot exceed the speed of sound if the rotor is to be efficient and quiet. Slowing the rotor rotational speed avoids this problem, but presents another. In the traditional method of the composition of velocity it is easy to understand that the velocity experienced by the retreating blade has a value that is produced by the vector composition of the velocity of blade rotation and the freestream velocity. In this condition it is evident that in presence of a sufficiently high advance ratio the velocity of air on the retreating blade is low. The flapping movement of the blade changes the angle of attack. It is then possible for the blade to reach the stall condition. In this case it is necessary that the stalling blade increases the pitch angle to keep some lift capability. This risk puts constraints on the design of the system. An accurate choice of the wing profile is necessary and careful dimensioning of the radius of the rotor for the specified speed range. Slow speed cyclorotors bypass this problem through a horizontal axis of rotation and operating at a comparatively low blade tip speed. For higher speeds, which may become necessary for industrial applications, it seems necessary to adopt more sophisticated strategies and solutions. A solution is the independent actuation of the blades which have been recently patented and successfully tested for naval use  by use on hydraulic actuation system. The horizontal axis of rotation always provides an advancement of the upper blades, that produce always a positive lift by the full rotor. These characteristics could help overcome two issues of helicopters: their low energy efficiency and the advance ratio limitation.

Unsteady aerodynamics
The advancement of the blades and oscillations are the two dynamic actions which are produced by a cyclorotor. It is evident that the wing-blades of a cyclorotor operates in different way than a traditional aircraft wing or a traditional helicopter wing. The blades of a cyclorotor oscillates by rotation around a point that rotating describes an ideal circumference. The combination of the advancement motion of the centre of rotation of the blade and the oscillation of the blade (it is a movement somehow similar to the pendulum), which continue to vary its pitch generate a complex set of aerodynamic phenomena: 
 the delay of the blade stall; 
 an increase of the maximum blade lift coefficient at low Reynolds numbers. 
The two effects are evidently correlated with a general increase of the thrust produced. 
If compared to a helicopter or any other propeller, it is evident that the same blade section in a rotocycloid produces much more thrust at the same Reynolds number. This effect can be explained by considering the traditional behavior of a propeller.

At low Reynolds numbers turbulence and laminar flow conditions can ever been reached. Considering a traditional wing profile it is evident that those conditions minimizes the speed differences between upper and lower face of the wing. It is then evident that both lift and stall speed are reduced. A consequence is a reduction of angle of attack at which stall conditions are reached.

In this regime, conventional propellers and rotors must use larger blade area and rotate faster to achieve the same propulsive forces and lose more energy to blade drag. It is then evident that a cyclorotor is much more energy efficient than any other propeller.

Actual cyclorotors bypass this problem by quickly increasing and then decreasing blade angle of attack, which temporarily delays stall and achieves a high lift coefficient. This unsteady lift makes cyclorotors more efficient at small scales, low velocities, and high altitudes than traditional propellers. 
It is otherwise evident that many living beings, such as birds, and some insects, are still much more efficient, because they can change not only the pitch but also the shape of their wings,  or they can change the property of the boundary layer such as sharkskin.

Some research tries to acquire the same level of efficiency of the natural examples of wings or surfaces. One direction is to introduce morphing wing concepts. Another relates to the introduction of boundary layer control mechanisms, such as dielectric barrier discharge.

Noise
During experimental evaluation, cyclorotors produced little aerodynamic noise. This is likely due to the lower blade tip speeds, which produce lower intensity turbulence following the blades.

Hovering thrust efficiency
In small-scale tests, cyclorotors achieved a higher power loading than comparable scale traditional rotors at the same disk loading. This is attributed to utilizing unsteady lift and consistent blade aerodynamic conditions. The rotational component of velocity on propellers increases from root to tip and requires blade chord, twist, airfoil, etc., to be varied along the blade. Since the cyclorotor blade span is parallel to the axis of rotation, each spanwise blade section operates at similar velocities and the entire blade can be optimized.

Structural considerations
Cyclorotor blades require support structure for their positioning parallel to the rotor axis of rotation. This structure, sometimes referred to as "spokes," adds to the parasite drag and weight of the rotor. Cyclorotor blades are also centrifugally loaded in bending (as opposed to the axial loading on propellers), which requires blades with an extremely high strength to weight ratio or intermediate blade support spokes. Early 20th century cyclorotors featured short blade spans, or additional support structure to circumvent this problem.

Blade pitch considerations
Cyclorotors require continuously actuated blade pitch. The relative flow angle experienced by the blades as they rotate about the rotor varies substantially with advance ratio and rotor thrust. To operate most efficiently a blade pitch mechanism should adjust for these diverse flow angles. High rotational velocities makes it difficult to implement an actuator based mechanism, which calls for a fixed or variable shape track for pitch control, mounted parallel to blade trajectory, onto which are placed blade's followers such as rollers or airpads - the pitch control track shape reliably determines blade's pitch along the orbit regardless of the blade's RPM. While the pitching motions used in hover are not optimized for forward flight, in experimental evaluation they were found to provide efficient flight up to an advance ratio near one.

Applications

Wind turbines
Wind turbines are a potential application of cyclorotors. They are named in this case variable-pitch vertical-axis wind turbines, with large benefits with respect to traditional VAWTs. This kind of turbine is stated to overcome most of the traditional limitations of traditional Darrieus VAWTs.

Ship propulsion and control
The most widespread application of cyclorotors is for ship propulsion and control. In ships the cyclorotor is mounted with the axis of rotation vertical so that thrust can quickly be vectored in any direction parallel to the plane of the water surface. In 1922, Kurt Kirsten fitted a pair of cyclorotors to a 32 ft boat in Washington, which eliminated the need for a rudder and provided extreme manoeuvrability. While the idea floundered in the United States after the Kirsten-Boeing Propeller Company lost a US Navy research grant, the Voith-Schneider propeller company successfully commercially employed the propeller. This Voith-Schneider propeller was fitted to more than 100 ships prior to the outbreak of the Second World War. Today, the same company sells the same propeller for highly manoeuvrable watercraft. It is applied on offshore drilling ships, tugboats, and ferries.

Aircraft

Cyclogyros

A cyclogyro is a vertical takeoff and landing aircraft using a cyclorotor as a rotor wing for lift and often also for propulsion and control. Advances in cyclorotor aerodynamics made the first untethered model cyclogyro flight possible in 2011 at the Northwestern Polytechnic Institute in China. Since then, universities and companies have successfully flown small-scale cyclogyros in several configurations.

The performance of traditional rotors is severely deteriorated at low Reynolds Numbers by low angle-of-attack blade stall. Current hover-capable MAVs can stay aloft for only minutes. Cyclorotor MAVs (very small scale cyclogyros) could utilize unsteady lift to extend endurance. The smallest cyclogyro flown to date weighs only 29 grams and was developed by the advanced vertical flight laboratory at Texas A&M university.

Commercial cyclogyro UAVs are being developed by D-Daelus and Pitch Aeronautics.

Airship propulsion and control
A large exposed area makes airships susceptible to gusts and difficult to takeoff, land, or moor in windy conditions. Propelling airships with cyclorotors could enable flight in more severe atmospheric conditions by compensating for gusts with rapid thrust vectoring. Following this idea, the US Navy seriously considered fitting of six primitive Kirsten-Boeing cyclorotors to the  airship. The Shenandoah crashed while transiting a squall line on 3 September 1925 before any possible installation and testing. No large scale tests have been attempted since, but a  cyclorotor airship demonstrated improved performance over a traditional airship configuration in a test.

See also

References

External links 

 

Aerodynamics
Propulsion
Propellers